David Younghusband (1883–1965) was a residential architect and building contractor in Ottawa, Ontario, Canada. His houses, typically brick construction in the Arts and Crafts style and featuring a centre hall plan, form a prominent part of the residential architectural fabric in a number of Ottawa neighbourhoods dating from the first half of the 20th century, in particular the Glebe neighbourhood.

References
 John Leaning, The story of the Glebe, accessed September 19, 2009.
 Maria Cook, Walking tour of the Glebe, Ottawa Citizen, September 18, 2009.

Canadian architects
1965 deaths
1883 births
People from Ottawa